Kuhsangi Rural District is a rural district (dehestan) in Miyan Velayat District, Taybad County, Razavi Khorasan Province, Iran. At the 2006 census, its population was 7,614, in 1,694 families.  The rural district has 6 villages.

References 

Rural Districts of Razavi Khorasan Province
Taybad County